A circlip (a portmanteau of "circle" and "clip"), also known as a C-clip, Rotor Clip, snap ring or Jesus clip, is a type of fastener or retaining ring consisting of a semi-flexible metal ring with open ends which can be snapped into place, into a machined groove on a dowel pin or other part to permit rotation but to prevent axial movement. There are two basic types: internal and external, referring to whether they are fitted into a bore or over a shaft.  Circlips are often used to secure pinned connections.

Details 
When used to retain piston wrist pins or gudgeon pins, the clips are known as wrist pin clips, wrist pin retainers, or gudgeon pin clips. The most commonly used circlip for this application is a simple spring steel circlip, or plain wire ring.

The term "Jesus clip" comes from the propensity of the clip's spring action to launch the clip at a high velocity when removing or installing, leading to remarks such as, "Oh Jesus, where did it go?"

E-clip

Common examples include e-clips (e-ring) and the (both internal and external) snap ring or circlip. These general types of fasteners are sized to provide an interference fit onto (or into, in the case of an internal fastener) a groove or land when in use, such that they must be elastically deformed in order to install or remove them.

Installation and maintenance 
The name snap ring generally refers to circlips which have the ends formed to aid installation and removal, and which are not formed from wire (i.e. do not have a round cross-section). These rings are designed to be installed and removed with special pliers. Some of these special pliers can be configured for internal or external clips, while in other cases one pliers is used for internal and another for external clips. For expediency in the field, a pair of needle-nose pliers (for internal clips) or leverage with a flat-headed screwdriver (internal or external) is sometimes used.

Since most snap rings are stamped from sheet steel, one side is slightly rounded and the other has sharp, rough edges. This is due to the stamping die behaving like a cookie cutter and causing a slight rounding of the upper edge of the cut clip. The snap ring must always be installed such that force is transmitted to the retaining groove from the rounded side of the ring, not the rough/square-edged side. If a snap ring is positioned such that its flat side is pressed into the rounded edge of the groove then when load or force is applied, the flat edge of the snap ring will "bite" into the rounded edge of the retaining groove. The snap ring will distort and ride up the rounded edge, spreading an external snap ring and compressing an internal snap ring. This leaves the clip prone to being forced out of its groove and failing at its retaining function. The accompanying images illustrate the correct orientation of the snap ring in its groove. Wet or dry lubrication is recommended to reduce friction against the circlip and maintain function.

References

External links

Definition with picture
Historical background

Fasteners